The flag of Tunisia is a rectangular panel of red color with an aspect ratio of 2:3. In the center of the cloth in a white circle is placed a red crescent, surrounding a red five-pointed star on three sides. Bey Tunisia Hussein II decided to create a flag for Tunisia, close in appearance to the modern one, after the Battle of Navarino on 20 October 1827; in 1831 he was officially approved. In that form, the flag existed during the French protectorate, and on 1 June 1959, it was proclaimed the state flag of the Republic of Tunisia (in accordance with the Tunisian Constitution). On 30 June 1999, the proportions and design of the flag were clarified by a special law. The general appearance of the flag remained virtually unchanged.

The crescent and the star depicted on the flag of Tunisia are traditional symbols of Islam and are also considered symbols of good luck.

History

Previous flags 
Until the mid-18th century, the design and significance of maritime flags flying on ships in Tunis are unknown. However, various sources have been able to distinguish certain similarities among the flags: they were designed with a crescent-oriented shape in the presence of the colors blue, green, red, and white. Thereafter, and until the early 19th century, the flag was composed of horizontal blue, red and green stripes, which are the colors of the ruling Husainid dynasty. This kind of flag with multiple bands and irregular contours floated on top of ships all along the coast of North Africa; similar flags with different colors and arrangements were also used in Africa.

According to Ottfried Neubecker, the Bey of Tunis also had his own flag. This flag was most likely a simple personal banner of the ruler, as it floated above the Bardo Palace, the Citadel of Tunis, on navy ships, and also in the center of the coat of arms in Tunisia. It was used at a number of public ceremonies until the abolition of the monarchy and proclamation of Republic on 25 July 1957.

Believed to have been introduced by Hussein II, although some sources, such as Abdel-Wahab, claim that it was in use three centuries earlier, the flag was rectangular in shape and divided into nine stripes, the middle one green and double the size of all other bands, while the others alternated between yellow and red. Featured in the center of the green stripe was the Zulfiqar, the legendary Islamic sword of Ali, with the blade in white and the hilt multicolored. The red and yellow stripes each contained five equidistant symbols, whose order was alternated between each stripe. These symbols were divided into two categories: one red six-sided star voided with a disk of a different color in the center—either a red star and green disk or a white star and blue disk—, and a large disk voided in its lower right by a small disk of different color, with the combination being either a small red disk within a larger blue disk or a small yellow disk within a larger green disk. The first yellow stripe contains three red stars and two blue disks. The second stripe, red in color, contains three green disksand two white stars. The third stripe (second yellow one) is identical to the first, with the exception that the star in its center is white, while the fourth stripe (second white one) is identical to the 2nd stripe.

Origin of the current flag 

Several Muslim countries along the south coast of the Mediterranean Sea used a plain red naval flag. After the destruction of the Tunisian naval division at the Battle of Navarino on 20 October 1827, the sovereign Husainid Dynasty leader Hussein II decided to create a flag to use for the fleet of Tunisia, to distinguish it from other fleets. There are some discrepancies over the date of the flag's adoption, as the government states that it was adopted in 1831, while other sources like Siobhan Ryan's Ultimate Pocket Flags of the World claim that it was adopted in 1835.

French protectorate 
During the era of the French protectorate in Tunisia, The Tunisian flag has not changed. However, according to an article in the Flag Bulletin publishing in Fall 2000, for a short period of time during the French protectorate, the flag of France was placed in the canton (upper left) of the Tunisian flag. In the same vein, vexillologist Whitney Smith stated that the addition of the French flag was "modification of the unofficial Tunisian national flag, used for a few years". He added:

Confusion arose when an issue of the French daily newspaper Le Petit Journal, published on 24 July 1904 on the occasion of the bey of Tunis's visit to France, reproduced an illustration showing the flag used while he was visiting the Hôtel de Ville, Paris. Ivan Sache of Flags of the World claimed that this flag design, which hadn't been seen earlier, may have been inaccurate, suggesting that the journalist might not have been at the affair or he had reproduced a drawing of the wrong flag.

Proposed flags 

The union project between Tunisia and Libya in 1973–1974 almost led to the unification of Tunisia and the Libyan Arab Republic. After a meeting between Habib Bourguiba and Muammar Gaddafi, Tunisian Foreign Minister Mohamed Masmoudi read a joint statement:

But, faced with the opposition that arose both within the regime and abroad, Bourguiba was forced to backtrack and abandon the project on the pretext of the unconstitutionality of the referendum. The flag itself would have taken the colors of the flag of Libya, floating between 1972 and 1977, but the falcon present in the center of this same flag would have been replaced by the star and the Tunisian red crescent, such as the treaty of l union describes it:

Description 

The Tunisian flag was defined in Article 4 of the 1 June 1959 constitution under these terms: "The flag of the Republic of Tunisia is red, it has, under the conditions defined by law, in the middle, a white disk containing a five-pointed star surrounded by a red crescent."

The Organic Law No. 99-56 of 30 June 1999, adopted on 3 July by the Chamber of Deputies, formalized the Tunisian flag for the first time in law, clarifying Article 4 of the constitution. The flag is in the form of a red rectangle with a width equal to two-thirds of its length. In the middle of the flag is a white disk whose diameter is equal to one-third of the length of the rectangle and whose center is located at the intersection of the diagonals of the rectangle. A red five-pointed star is located to the right of the disk, whose center is at a distance equal to one-thirtieth of the length of the flag from the center of the disk.

The location of the star's five points is determined by an imaginary disk centered on the star's center, its diameter equal to roughly 15% the length of the flag. The points of the star are equidistant from each other, and one of the points is located on the horizontal median of the flag to the left of the center of the imaginary disk. The star is surrounded on its left by a red crescent made by the intersection of two arcs, an outer arc whose diameter is equal to one-fourth of the length of the flag, and an internal arc with a diameter equal to one-fifth of the flag's length. In addition, at the top of the flag used by the President of the Republic, the words "for the nation" are written in gold. The three outer edges of the flag are lined with golden yellow fringe and a red ribbon, with golden fringe on the right vertical side and a white disk with a star and crescent near the fringe, is attached to the flag pole above the flag.

Article 4 of the 1959 constitution specifies the presence of a technical dossier containing a model of the flag, a guide to drawing it, which includes the proper measurements, and technical specifications of its colors.

Colours scheme

Symbolism 

For the Tunisian embassy in France, the color red represents the blood of Tunisian martyrs killed during the Crusades before the advent of the Ottomans on 1574. Another interpretation is that the "red Beylical flag spread light throughout the Muslim world". The white symbolizes peace, the disk symbolizes the radiance of the nation as the sun, while the crescent and five-pointed star represent unity of all Muslims and the Five Pillars of Islam, respectively.

According to Ludvík Mucha, author of Webster's Concise Encyclopedia of Flags & Coats of Arms, the white disk located in the center of the flag represents the sun. The red crescent and the five-pointed star, two ancient symbols of Islam, were appeared on many flags of Islamic countries. The crescent is, from the viewpoint of an Arabic observer, supposed to bring good luck. The color red represents the blood of martyrs.

Whitney Smith states that the crescent was first emblazoned on standards and buildings in the Punic state of Carthage, located in present-day Tunisia. Nevertheless, they were widely adopted by Muslim countries, and have become known as symbols of Islam, when in fact, they may be cultural symbols. Likewise, the sun is often represented with the crescent on ancient Punic artifacts and is associated with the ancient Punic religion, especially with the Sign of Tanit.

Protocol 

The Tunisian flag is visible on all public and military buildings. The flag also betokens Tunisian ambassadors at regional and international meetings as well as at buildings housing Tunisian representatives around the world. It is deployed during commemorations and national honors in a strictly ceremonial manner. On the listed Flag Days below, the Tunisian flag is flown in public buildings, compulsory by law:

Article 129 of Penal Code of Tunisia punishes the insult either "publicly, by words, writings, gestures or any other manner" of the Tunisian flag and also foreign flags with one year imprisonment.

Variants 
The colors of the flag are included in other Tunisian symbols, such as the coat of arms, which contains a crescent and star enclosed in a disk with red border. In addition, equipment belonging to the Tunisian army are visually recognized by the presence of a cockade.

Most political parties of Tunisia reflect the colors of the flag or the flag itself.
Many postal stamps reflect the motifs of the flag, which radiate "with brightness" on them.

Tunisian flag disambiguation from Tunisian Red Crescent 

The International Red Cross and Red Crescent movement offers 3 main symbols (a cross, a crescent or a crystal shape) to national committees. Though neither emblem has any religious association, most majority Muslim population countries chose a Red crescent facing to the right, to avoid perceived religious connotations of the Red Cross. However, in Tunisia, such a symbol could be difficult to distinguish from the roundel on Tunisian military equipment. Therefore, to clearly distinguish on a battlefield the neutrality of ambulances and other equipment and personnel belonging to the Red Crescent from the military ones, the Tunisian Red Crescent Society is the only one in the world to have adopted as logo a crescent facing to the left.

Notes

References

External links 

 

Tunisia
1831 establishments in Africa
1831 establishments in the Ottoman Empire
19th-century establishments in Tunisia
National symbols of Tunisia
Tunisia
Tunisia
Tunisia
Tunisia